Torn Curtain is a 1966 American political thriller film directed by Alfred Hitchcock, and starring Paul Newman and Julie Andrews. Written by Brian Moore, the film is set in the Cold War. It is about an American scientist who appears to defect behind the Iron Curtain to East Germany.

Plot
In 1965, Michael Armstrong (Paul Newman), a US physicist and rocket scientist, is traveling to a conference in Copenhagen with his assistant and fiancée, Sarah Sherman (Julie Andrews). Armstrong receives a radiogram to pick up a book in Copenhagen; it contains a message which says, "Contact  in case of emergency." He tells Sherman he is going to Stockholm, but she discovers he is flying to East Berlin and follows him. When they land, he is welcomed by representatives of the East German government. Sherman realizes that Armstrong has defected, and is appalled that, given the circumstances of the Cold War, if she stays with him, she will likely never see her home or family again.

Armstrong visits a contact, a "farmer" (Mort Mills), where it is revealed that his defection is in fact a ruse to gain the confidence of the East German scientific establishment, in order to learn how much their chief scientist Gustav Lindt (Ludwig Donath) and by extension, the Soviet Union, knows about anti-missile systems.

However, he was followed to the farm by his appointed chaperone, Hermann Gromek (Wolfgang Kieling), an East German security officer. Gromek realizes what  is and that Armstrong is a double agent, and as Gromek is calling the police, a tortuous struggle commences that ends with Gromek being killed by Armstrong and the farmer's wife (Carolyn Conwell). Gromek and his motorcycle are buried on the land. The taxicab driver (Peter Lorre Jr., uncredited) who drove Armstrong to the farm, however, sees Gromek's picture in the newspaper and reports him to the police.

Visiting the physics faculty of Karl Marx University in Leipzig the next day, Armstrong's interview with the scientists ends abruptly when he is questioned by security officials about the missing Gromek. The faculty try to interrogate Sherman about her knowledge of the American "Gamma Five" anti-missile program, but she refuses to cooperate and runs from the room, even though she has agreed to defect to East Germany. Armstrong catches up with her and secretly confides his actual motives, and asks her to go along with the ruse.

Armstrong finally goads Professor Lindt into revealing his anti-missile equations in a fit of pique over what Lindt believes are Armstrong's mathematical mistakes. When Lindt hears over the university's loudspeaker system that Armstrong and Sherman are being sought for questioning, he realizes that he has given up his secrets while learning nothing in return. Armstrong and Sherman escape from the school with the help of the university clinic physician Dr. Koska (Gisela Fischer).

The couple travel to East Berlin, pursued by the Stasi, in a decoy bus operated by the  network, led by Mr. Jacobi (David Opatoshu). Roadblocks, highway robbery by Soviet Army deserters, and bunching with the "real" bus result in the police becoming aware of the deception, and everyone aboard is forced to flee. While looking for the Friedrichstraße post office, the two encounter the exiled Polish countess Kuczynska (Lila Kedrova) who leads them to the post office in hopes of being sponsored for a US visa. When they are spotted, Kuczynska trips the pursuing guard and allows Armstrong and Sherman to escape to their next destination.

Two men approach them on the pavement, one of whom is the "farmer". He gives them tickets to the ballet as part of a plan to smuggle them to Sweden that evening inside the ballet troupe's luggage. While attending the ballet and waiting to be picked up, they are spotted and reported to the police by the lead ballerina (Tamara Toumanova), who flew to East Berlin on the same airplane as Armstrong.

Armstrong and Sherman escape through the crowd by shouting "fire". They are hidden inside two hampers of costumes and ferried across the Baltic Sea to Sweden on an East German freighter.

Cast

Production

Background
By the time  Torn Curtain, his fiftieth film, was conceived, Hitchcock was the most famous film director in Hollywood, having already reached the pinnacle of commercial success six years before with Psycho (1960). Audiences eagerly anticipated his next film. To find a gripping plot, Hitchcock turned towards the spy thriller genre, which was greatly in fashion since the early 1960s  with the success of the James Bond series starting in 1962 with Dr. No. Hitchcock had already found success in that genre many times, most recently in 1959 with North by Northwest.

The idea behind Torn Curtain came from the defection of British diplomats Guy Burgess and Donald Maclean to the Soviet Union in 1951. Hitchcock was particularly intrigued about Maclean's life in the Soviet Union and about Melinda Marling, Maclean's wife, who followed her husband behind the Iron Curtain a year later with the couple's three children. With these facts as a starting point Hitchcock created a plot line involving an American nuclear physicist, Professor Michael Armstrong, defecting to East Germany. Against his will, the physicist is followed to East Berlin by his fiancée and assistant, who decides to remain loyal to him regardless of his intentions. The twist of the story is that Professor Armstrong is in fact a member of a secret spy ring and he has defected only with the idea of stealing a formula from an East German scientist.

Writing
In autumn 1964, Hitchcock offered to let Vladimir Nabokov, the author of Lolita, who had successfully helped adapt his own novel to a well-regarded film directed by Stanley Kubrick in 1962, write the script. Although intrigued, Nabokov declined the project, feeling that he knew very little about a political thriller.

As the original focus of the plot was on the female lead, the spy's girlfriend, the script was commissioned early in 1965 to Irish-Canadian writer Brian Moore, who was known for successfully tackling female characters. His well-regarded first novel, Judith Hearne, centers on an alcoholic Belfast spinster. In addition to this, Moore had adapted his own novel The Luck of Ginger Coffey into a film the previous year. Moore moved to Hollywood to work on the script. His five-page synopsis, completed on 26 March 1965, already contained two key scenes of the film: Torn Curtain'''s opening aboard a cruise steamer in the Norwegian fjords, and the brutal killing of undercover agent Gromek by the American scientist and a farm woman. Moore's final draft, completed by June 21, pleased neither Hitchcock nor Universal. It lacked the humor and sparkle characteristic of a Hitchcock film. On his part, Moore complained that Hitchcock had "no concept of character" and that he had "a profound ignorance of human motivation". Brian Moore's own dissatisfaction with the project was reflected in his novel Fergus (1970), which features Bernard Boweri, an unsympathetic character based on Hitchcock.

To polish the dialogue and improve the script, Hitchcock hired British authors Keith Waterhouse and Willis Hall, known for their screenplays for Whistle Down the Wind (1961), A Kind of Loving (1962), and Billy Liar (1963), the latter based on the novel by Waterhouse. They worked rewriting some dialogue, on a day-by-day basis, as the film was shot. However, their contribution was restricted by the director's resistance to change and concern for detail. His notes to them were like these: "Scene 88. We should eliminate the floor concierge. My information is that they do not have these in East Berlin;
Scene 127 C. I would like to discuss the place where the sausage is carved; On Scene 139, where we had someone describing the Julie Andrews character as beautiful... do you think beautiful is perhaps too much, and cannot we say lovely instead?"

Submitted to arbitration, the Writers Guild gave sole script credits to Brian Moore.

Casting
Hitchcock had to compromise in his casting choices. Initially, he wanted Eva Marie Saint, the blonde star of North by Northwest,  for the female lead. Hitchcock also spoke in 1965 to Cary Grant about appearing in the film, only to learn that Grant intended to make just one more film and then retire. 
Hitchcock had wanted English actress Samantha Eggar for the lead female role.
Universal Pictures executives insisted on famous stars being cast for the leads.  Paul Newman and Julie Andrews were imposed on Hitchcock by Lew Wasserman, the studio executive, rather than being his real choices. The director felt that the stars were ill-suited to their roles, while their salaries of $750,000 took a big part of the film's $5 million budget.
At the time Julie Andrews was Hollywood's biggest star after the back-to-back successes of her films Mary Poppins (1964)  and The Sound of Music (1965). As she was much in demand, Andrews was available for only a short period of time, and that meant the production of the film was rushed, although Hitchcock was not yet satisfied with the script.

Hitchcock surrounded Newman and Andrews with colorful supporting actors: Lila Kedrova, fresh from winning an Academy Award for Zorba the Greek,  as the eccentric and flamboyantly dressed Countess Kuczynska who helps Armstrong and Sherman in their escape in return for their sponsoring her to go to America; Tamara Toumanova as the haughty prima ballerina whose limelight Armstrong steals when he arrives in East Berlin; Ludwig Donath as the crotchety professor Lindt, eager  to cut the chat and get down to business; and Wolfgang Kieling as the sinister Hermann Gromek, the gum-chewing personal guide the East German authorities provide to shadow Armstrong's every move.

Filming
Hitchcock initially wanted to shoot the film entirely on location in the Eastern Bloc but could not because he refused to give East German officials a copy of his screen play. Moore later said that Hitchcock probably could have secured filming permits in East Germany, Czechoslovakia, and Poland if he had tried harder. Principal photography of the film began on 18 October 1965, on Stage 18 at the Universal back lot in Los Angeles. The shooting schedule lasted three months, including a two-week hiatus while Paul Newman recuperated from a chin infection. Filming was completed in mid-February 1966.

Although unexcited about his leading actress, Hitchcock was always very polite with Julie Andrews. About her experience making the film Andrews commented: "I did not have to act in Torn Curtain. I merely went along for the ride. I don't feel that  the part demanded much of me, other than to look glamorous, which Mr Hitchcock can always arrange better than anyone. I did have reservations about this film, but I wasn't agonized by it. The kick of it was working for Hitchcock. That's what I did it for, and that's what I got out of it."

The working relationship between Hitchcock and Newman was problematic. Newman came from a different generation of actors from the likes of Cary Grant and James Stewart. He questioned Hitchcock about the script and the characterization throughout filming. Hitchcock later said he found Newman's manner and approach unacceptable and disrespectful. Newman insisted that he meant no disrespect toward Hitchcock, and once said, "I think Hitch and I could have really hit it off, but the script kept getting in the way." When Newman, a Method actor, consulted Hitchcock about his character's motivations, the director replied: "motivation is your salary." Furthermore, as Hitchcock discovered, the expected onscreen chemistry between Newman and Andrews failed to materialize.

Unsatisfied with the actors cast in the leads, Hitchcock shifted the point of view of the plot from the defecting scientist's wife to the American amateur spy and he centered his attention in the colorful international actors who played supporting roles in the film. Lila Kedrova was Hitchcock's favorite among the cast; he ate lunch with her several times during filming and invited her home for dinners with his wife. Although the length of the film was shortened in post-production, Hitchcock left intact Countess Kuczynska's scenes in the final film.

The film's climax in a theater was filmed on Sound Stage 28 at Universal Studios. Stage 28 was also used in the 1925 and 1943 versions of The Phantom of the Opera with Lon Chaney, Sr., 41 years earlier. The set was demolished in 2014.

Perhaps the best-known scene is the fight to the death between Armstrong and Gromek, a gruesome, prolonged struggle. In conversation with François Truffaut, Hitchcock said that he included the scene to show the audience how difficult it can be to kill a man, because a number of spy thrillers at the time made killing look effortless.

Alfred Hitchcock's cameo is a signature occurrence in most of his films. In Torn Curtain he can be seen (eight minutes into the film) sitting in the lobby of the Hotel d'Angleterre holding a baby. The music playing at this point is an adaptation of Funeral March of a Marionette, the theme for Alfred Hitchcock Presents.

Steven Spielberg told James Lipton on Inside the Actors Studio that as a young man he sneaked onto the soundstage to observe the filming, and remained for 45 minutes before an assistant producer asked him to leave.

The production occurred during the 1965 Watts race riots, leaving Kieling disgusted with American society. As a result, after the film was released he defected to East Germany in real life, calling the United States "the most dangerous enemy of humanity in the world today" and guilty of "crimes against the Negro and the people of Vietnam."

Music
The film had two scores. The first was written by Bernard Herrmann, a recurrent contributor to Hitchcock's work. Hitchcock and Universal asked Herrmann for a pop-and-jazz-influenced soundtrack, and even hoped Herrmann might write a song for lead actress Julie Andrews to perform. However, the score Herrmann provided was not what Hitchcock and the studio wanted, and his revisions failed to satisfy them. Hitchcock and Herrmann ended their long-time collaboration and John Addison was approached to write the score.

Although the Addison score was issued commercially in 1966 (and has been re-released), the Herrmann score has been re-recorded and reissued several times, eclipsing that by Addison in terms of available versions. Recordings of Herrmann's original studio sessions exist, and have circulated online. Elmer Bernstein made the first commercial recording of the score with the Royal Philharmonic Orchestra on Warner Brothers Records in 1978. Esa-Pekka Salonen recorded a suite from the film as part of a Herrmann album with the Los Angeles Philharmonic Orchestra in 1996. Joel McNeely subsequently recorded an expanded version with the National Philharmonic Orchestra for Varese Sarabande Records in 2010.

In the climactic scene involving the ballet at the East Berlin theatre, the music was excerpted from Tchaikovsky's Francesca da Rimini.

ReleaseTorn Curtain was released without any rating on 14 July 1966 (see original 1966 movie poster above). However, the film was given an "R" (for "Restricted") under the MPAA film rating system that took effect November 1, 1968. It was ultimately re-rated PG in 1984.

Reception
After its premiere in 1966, the film was criticized, especially in terms of its production technology, as being old-fashioned. The film was nevertheless a minor hit for Hitchcock, making $7 million in the United States alone. The film ranked 8th on Cahiers du Cinéma's Top 10 Films of the Year List in 1966.

The film earned poor reviews from critics. Bosley Crowther of The New York Times called the film "a pathetically undistinguished spy picture, and the obvious reason is that the script is a collection of what Mr. Hitchcock most eschews—clichés." Penelope Houston, writing for Sight & Sound, commented: "What went wrong here, one suspects, was something basic in the story line."  The reviewer in Variety said: "Some good plot ideas are marred by routine dialogue, and a too relaxed pace contributed to a dull overlength," adding "Hitchcock freshens up his bag of tricks in a good potpourri which becomes a bit stale though a noticeable lack of zip and pacing." "Awful," "preposterous," and "irritating slack," concluded Renata Adler in The New Yorker. The Monthly Film Bulletin wrote, "Up until about the point at which the plot makes itself clear, Torn Curtain is as good as anything Hitchcock has ever done in his other forty-nine (or is it fifty-one?) films ... The let-down comes with the verdant studio hillock that was surely never meant to fool anyone, and after this the film drops like a stone, without impetus, without imagination, without interest."

Richard Schickel, writing in Life, concluded: "Hitchcock is tired to the point where what once seemed highly personal style is now repetitions of past triumphs."

Writing in Punch, Richard Mallet asserted: "The film as a whole may be a bit diffuse... but it has some brilliant scenes, it's pleasing to the eye, and it is continuously entertaining." Richard L. Coe of The Washington Post also liked the film, writing that "Hitchcock has given us several sequences that will prove memorable." He singled out Countess Kuzynska's search for a sponsor for her escape to the United States as a sequence that stood as "a short story in itself. It could be shown independently of the rest of the film, a gripping vignette with a beginning, a middle and an end."Torn Curtain holds a 65% rating on review aggregator Rotten Tomatoes based on 31 reviews with an average rating of 6.4/10.

See also
 List of American films of 1966

References

Sources
 Busby, Brian. Character Parts: Who's Really Who in CanLit. Knopf, Toronto, 2003. .
 Dassanowsky, Robert. "'Ceci n'est pas une Allemagne': On the Treachery of Images and the Deconstruction of Hitchcock’s Thriller in Torn Curtain." Hitchcock and the Cold War: New Essays on the Espionage Films, 1956-1969. Ed. Walter Raubicheck. Pace University Press, New York. 2018. 
 Maxford, Howard. The A - Z of Hitchcock: The Ultimate Reference Guide, B.T Batsford, London, 2002. 
 McGilligan, Patrick. Alfred Hitchcock: A Life in Darkness and Light. Regan Books, New York, 2003. 
 Perry, George. The Complete Phantom of the Opera''. New York: Henry Holt and Company, 1987. .

External links

 
 
 
 
 

1966 films
1960s political thriller films
1960s spy thriller films
American political thriller films
American spy thriller films
Cold War spy films
Films directed by Alfred Hitchcock
Films produced by Alfred Hitchcock
Films scored by John Addison
Films set in 1965
Films set in Berlin
Films set in Copenhagen
Films set in Norway
Films set in the Baltic Sea
Films shot in Denmark
Universal Pictures films
Works by Brian Moore (novelist)
Films set in East Germany
Films set in Leipzig
1960s English-language films
1960s American films